George Kayode Noah (born October 1957) is a Nigerian journalist and former state official. Noah was the managing director of the Lagos State Signage & Advertisement Agency between 2011 and 2015, an agency of the Lagos State Government responsible for regulating and controlling outdoor advertising and signage displays in the state.

Education
Noah attended ADC Primary School in Apapa, followed by secondary education at the Apostolic Church Grammar School in Lagos. He did his A-levels at the then Ahmadiya College Agege, Lagos and The Polytechnic, Ibadan. Whilst at the Polytechnic he also passed the University of Cambridge A-level exams. He then attended the University of Ibadan, graduating in political science with honours. Noah is a member of the Strategic Planning Society in London and a fellow of the National Institute of Marketing.

Political activism
Noah was elected House Secretary of the University of Ibadan Students Union in 1979, in a landslide victory.

He was a founding member of Radio Kudirat that was named for Kudirat Abiola, the anti-military rule radio station that was based in Norway. It was done under the auspices of Media Empowerment for Africa. Radio Kudirat was backed by the American, British, Swedish, Danish and Norwegian governments in their quest to end brutal military dictatorship in Nigeria.

Some of the founding members were the late Chief Anthony Enahoro, Professor Wole Soyinka, Asiwaju Bola Tinubu, Governor Kayode Fayemi of Ekiti State, Dr. Olaokun Soyinka, Ilemakin Soyinka, Hon. Olawale Osun, Lemi Gbolahan and Richmond Dayo Johnson. The radio station had contributors that included Senator Tokunbo Afikuyomi, Professor Gbadegesin, Professor Bolaji Aluko, Senator Sola Adeyeye, Former Edo State Governor, His Excellence Odigie Oyegun and his then Deputy and Rev. Peter Obadan. Radio Kudirat was in operation for three years between 1996 and 1999.

Noah took a sabbatical from his business in the UK to work on the Radio Kudirat project in Stavanger, Norway. He anchored the very first broadcast of the station from Norway to Nigeria on June 12, 1996. Encouraged to take part in nation building by Asiwaju Bola Tinubu and Senator Tokunbo Afikuyomi, Noah returned from exile in 2000.

Career
Noah has over 30 years’ experience in virtually all aspects of the media. These include broadcasting (TV and radio), journalism (electronic and print), publishing, advertising, marketing and public relations.

He accumulated this experience within and outside Nigeria. His first job in the media started with Insight Communications Limited, a major marketing communications group in the West African sub region. His first boss was Mr Jimi Awosika, the current MD of Insight.

Noah would later end up in the UK where he worked briefly with Croftel Limited and Univite Nutrition. In 1984, he joined the Greater London Council as a public relations officer. His major remit at the Greater London Council was the anti-abolition campaign where he worked with London-based advertising agency Boase Massimi Pollitt.

In 1986, he joined British Telecom International as a marketing development executive and rose to the positions of marketing development manager and products and services portfolio analyst. Noah left British Telecom in 1990 to set up Universal Communications Group as managing director. The company published THE JOBPAPER, the first free advertisement recruitment weekly newspaper in the UK and the first audio text news and information service in the UK with satellite networks in the USA. Other investors in the JOBPAPER project included the Moshood Kashimawo Olawale Abiola, former MDs of Guarantee Trust Bank, Tayo Aderinokun, and Fola Adeola. Others were Bode Agusto, Cyril Chukwumah, First Marina Trust, Wahab Bello, Lekan Bello, Sumbo Rahman and a few others. Noah was appointed chairman of the London-Borough of Southwark Co-operative Development Agency in 1992.

After returning from a self-exile in 2000 Noah started Community Communication and Publishing Limited publishers of Island News the free weekly community newspaper for Lagos Island, Ikoyi, Victoria Island, Lekki and Ajah. In August 2011, the governor of Lagos State, Babatunde Fashola, appointed him as the managing director of Lagos State Signage and Advertisement Agency (LASAA) where he served between 2011 and 2015. The appointment heralded Noah's second stint in the public sector the first being the Greater London Council in the UK.

Achievements and awards
Building on the achievements of his predecessors, Noah accomplished several initiatives at LASAA, including making it the first institution in the country to introduce Skype as a customer service platform, implementing Africa's first water projection advertising in Lagos, part implementation of directional street signs and the House numbering project, audience measurement research for outdoor advertisers, spearheading collaboration with other outdoor advertising regulatory bodies and stakeholders.

In 2014 Noah led the team that organized what turned out to be one of Africa's biggest outdoor advertising conference and exhibition and attracted key industry stakeholders including the Advertising Practitioners Council of Nigeria, the Outdoor Advertising Association of Nigeria, the Advertisers Association of Nigeria, the Media Independent Practitioners Association of Nigeria, and the Experiential Marketers Association of Nigeria and the Association of Advertising Agencies of Nigeria. In addition, outdoor regulatory agencies from Ondo, Kano, Ogun, Edo, Cross River and Kwara states took part. Similarly, LASAA's counterparts from Cameroon and Kenya were in attendance. The managing director of LASAA, George Noah, said it was a deliberate decision to invite students of Mass Communication in all higher institutions in the country for the conference. Our objective is to raise the profile of outdoor advertising right from the university. In all, over 500 delegates attended the outdoor conference and about 5,000 attended the exhibition.

Perhaps the most significant of Noah's achievements at LASAA is the successful hosting of three editions of the Lagos Countdown. Drawing an audience of over 100,000 revellers, the Lagos Countdown is arguably Africa's biggest New year’s eve party.

In addition to his core function he performed while heading LASAA, Noah has also served on key state government think tanks and policy development committees, including the Lagos Economic Summit (Ehingbeti) the state’s Revenue Think Tank and the committee for the regeneration of Ijora Badiya and Obalende, Lagos.

In June 2014, this astute technocratic leader was awarded the honorary title Lagos state Man of the year, after beating 9 other nominees to clinch the award, this other nominees are accomplished leaders and captain of multinational corporations drawn from within the public and private sector.

References

1957 births
Living people
People from Lagos
University of Ibadan alumni
The Polytechnic, Ibadan alumni
Nigerian media personalities
Residents of Lagos